Sharon Memorial Park is a crematory and cemetery located at 5716 Monroe Road in Charlotte, North Carolina. Notable people interred there include baseball players Bob Porterfield and Ben Paschal, and former Daytona 500 winner Buddy Baker.

References

External links
Official website

Cemeteries in North Carolina